United States vehicle emission standards are set through a combination of legislative mandates enacted by Congress through Clean Air Act (CAA) amendments from 1970 onwards, and executive regulations managed nationally by the Environmental Protection Agency (EPA), and more recently along with the National Highway Traffic Safety Administration (NHTSA). These standard cover common motor vehicle air pollution, including carbon monoxide, nitrogen oxides, and particulate emissions, and newer versions have incorporated fuel economy standards.

In nearly all cases, these agencies set standards that are expected to be met on a fleet-wide basis from automobile and other vehicle manufacturers, with states delegated to enforce those standards but not allowed to set stricter requirements. California has generally been the exception, having been granted a waiver and given allowance to set stricter standards as it had established its own via the California Air Resources Board prior to the 1970 CAA amendments. Several other states have since also gotten waivers to follow California's standards, which have also become a de facto standard for vehicle manufacturers to follow. 
 
Vehicle emission standards have generally been points of debate between the government, vehicle manufacturers, and environmental groups, and has become a point of political debate.

Legislative and regulation history

Clean Air Act of 1963 (CAA)
The Clean Air Act of 1963 (CAA) was passed as an extension of the Air Pollution Control Act of 1955, encouraging the federal government via the United States Public Health Service under the then-Department of Health, Education, and Welfare (HEW) to encourage research and development towards reducing pollution and working with states to establish their own emission reduction programs. The CAA was amended in 1965 with the Motor Vehicle Air Pollution Control Act (MVAPCA) which gave the HEW Secretary authority to set federal standards for vehicle emissions as early as 1967.

California Air Resources Board (CARB)

In the mid-20th century, California's economy grew rapidly after the Great Depression, but this economic development was accompanied by an increase in air pollution in the state. As a result, smog started to form in the valleys of Southern California, causing respiratory problems for humans and damaging crops.In the 1960s, Dutch chemist Arie Jan Haagen-Smit identified the air pollutants responsible for the smog: carbon monoxide, hydrocarbons, and nitrogen oxides emitted from cars and factories through inefficient fuel combustion. Haagen-Smit also discovered that these air pollutants react with sunlight to form ozone, a major component of smog. As a response to this situation, the California Air Resources Board (CARB) was established in 1967 with Haagen-Smit as its first chairman. CARB set stringent vehicle emission standards to reduce air pollution in the state. California established the California Air Resources Board (CARB) in 1967, with Haagen-Smit as its first chairman, which among other activities set stringent vehicle emission standards by that year.

Other states were also facing similar air pollution issues at the same time, but fearing that setting too strict a standard would drive away automobile manufacturers, they considered implementing standards that were less restrictive compared to California, potentially creating a patchwork of regulations across the United States. The automobile industry lobbied to Congress, and the CAA was modified in 1967 with the National Emissions Standards Act (also known as the Air Quality Act) that expressly prevented states from setting more restrictive emission standards than the federal levels. However, because California has already established its program, it was granted a waiver and allowed to keep its standards. This Act did give states the authority to perform vehicle inspections programs beyond the requirements for new vehicles, though few states took their own action on this.

Formation of the Environmental Protection Agency and the Clear Air Act Amendment of 1970
Air pollution had become a major national focal point by 1970, leading to a major amendment to the CAA. Near the end of 1970, the United States Environmental Protection Agency (EPA) was formed out of an executive order under President Richard Nixon with ratification by Congress to consolidate all of the environmental-related executive-branch programs to a single entity; the new agency was reflect as the primary agency for administering the CAA going forward. Among the provisions related to vehicle emissions:
 The 1970 Amendment required EPA to define the National Ambient Air Quality Standards (NAAQS), to be set and updated by the EPA. The NAAQS, at passage of the 1970 amendment, included the pollutants carbon monoxide, nitrogen dioxide, sulfur dioxide, particulate matter, hydrocarbons and photochemical oxidants (such as ozone). Other pollutants, such as lead, were added later based on EPA review of current conditions. Along with the other activities set by the EPA, the states were to create State Implementation Plans (SIP)s to bring their air quality within the NAAQS by 1975.
 The Amendment also required the EPA to define emission standards for new vehicles to help with the NAAQS emission reduction goals, including standards for fuel and testing of new vehicles to make sure these standards are met.
Additionally, the 1970 CAA Amendment continued California's waiver program through which California can seek exemptions from the EPA's emissions requirements as long as theirs are at least as strict as the EPA's vehicle standards.

Clear Air Act Amendment of 1977
The EPA's assessment of the state of the country meeting the target NAAQS goals by 1975 was poor, having identified numerous nonattainment areas in the country. With the 1977 Amendment to the CAA, a new deadline of December 31, 1982, for meeting the NAAQS was fixed with no allowance for extending the deadline unless specific control measures were established. Among other key provisions was the establishment of required vehicle inspection and maintenance programs (I/M) in nonattainment states and optional in other areas. This required that states establish emission testing facilities for in-use vehicles to make sure they meet emissions requirements, maintained and repaired as necessary to correct any problems before their license was renewed. The EPA was tasked to establish the basic protocols for these facilities. Other states that had met the NAAQS attainment goals could optionally establish I/M programs for existing but were required to follow the EPA's specifications.

New vehicle emission standards 
Due to its preexisting standards and particularly severe motor vehicle air pollution problems in the Los Angeles metropolitan area, the U.S. state of California has special dispensation from the federal government to promulgate its own automobile emissions standards.  Other states may choose to follow either the national standard or the stricter California standards.
The following states that have adopted the California standards are: Colorado, Connecticut, Delaware, Maine, Maryland, Massachusetts, New Jersey, New Mexico (2011 model year and later), New York, Nevada, Oregon, Pennsylvania, Rhode Island, Virginia, Vermont, and Washington (2009 model year and later), as well as the District of Columbia. Such states are frequently referred to as "CARB states" in automotive discussions because the regulations are defined by the California Air Resources Board.

The EPA adopted the Californian fuel economy and green house gas standard as a national standard by the 2016 model year and is collaborating with Californian regulators on stricter national emissions standards for model years 2017–2025.

Criteria pollutants

Light-duty vehicles 

Light-duty vehicles are certified for compliance with emission standards by measuring their tailpipe emissions during rigorously-defined driving cycles that simulate a typical driving pattern. The FTP-75 city driving test (averaging about ) and the HWFET highway driving test (averaging about ) are used for measuring both emissions and fuel economy.

Two sets, or tiers, of emission standards for light-duty vehicles in the United States were defined as a result of the Clean Air Act Amendments of 1990.  The Tier I standard was adopted in 1991 and was phased in from 1994 to 1997. Tier II standards were phased in from 2004 to 2009.

Within the Tier II ranking, there is a subranking ranging from BIN 1–10, with 1 being the cleanest (Zero Emission vehicle) and 10 being the dirtiest.  The former Tier 1 standards that were effective from 1994 until 2003 were different between automobiles and light trucks (SUVs, pickup trucks, and minivans), but Tier II standards are the same for both types.

These standards specifically restrict emissions of carbon monoxide (CO), oxides of nitrogen (NOx), particulate matter (PM), formaldehyde (HCHO), and non-methane organic gases (NMOG) or non-methane hydrocarbons (NMHC).  The limits are defined in grams per mile (g/mi).

Phase 1: 1994–1999 
These standards were phased in from 1994 to 1997 and were phased out in favor of the national Tier 2 standard from 2004 to 2009.

Tier I standards cover vehicles with a gross vehicular weight rating (GVWR) below 8,500 pounds (3,856 kg) and are divided into five categories: one for passenger cars, and four for light-duty trucks (which include SUVs and minivans) divided up based on the vehicle weight and cargo capacity.

California's Low-emission vehicle (LEV) program defines six automotive emission standards which are stricter than the United States' national Tier regulations. Listed in order of increasing stringency, the standards are:
 TLEV – Transitional low-emission vehicle
 LEV – Low-emission vehicle
 ULEV – Ultra-low-emission vehicle
 SULEV – Super-ultra low-emission vehicle
 ZEV – Zero-emission vehicle

The last category is largely restricted to electric vehicles and hydrogen cars, although such vehicles are usually not entirely non-polluting.  In those cases, the other emissions are transferred to another site, such as a power plant or hydrogen reforming center, unless such sites run on renewable energy.

Transitional NLEV: 1999–2003
A set of transitional and initially voluntary "national low emission vehicle" (NLEV) standards were in effect starting in 1999 for northeastern states and 2001 in the rest of the country until Tier II, adopted in 1999, began to be phased in from 2004 onwards.  The National Low Emission Vehicle program covered vehicles below  GVWR and adapted the national standards to accommodate California's stricter regulations.

Phase 2: 2004–2009 
Instead of basing emissions on vehicle weight, Tier II standards are divided into several numbered "bins".  Eleven bins were initially defined, with bin 1 being the cleanest (zero-emission vehicle) and 11 the dirtiest.  However, bins 9, 10, and 11 are temporary.  Only the first ten bins were used for light-duty vehicles below  GVWR, but medium-duty passenger vehicles up to  GVWR and to all 11 bins.  Manufacturers can make vehicles which fit into any of the available bins, but still must meet average targets for their entire fleets.

The two least-restrictive bins for passenger cars, 9 and 10, were phased out at the end of 2006.  However, bins 9 and 10 were available for classifying a restricted number of light-duty trucks until the end of 2008, when they were removed along with bin 11 for medium-duty vehicles. As of 2009, light-duty trucks must meet the same emissions standards as passenger cars.

Tier II regulations also defined restrictions for the amount of sulfur allowed in gasoline and diesel fuel, since sulfur can interfere with the operation of advanced exhaust treatment systems such as selective catalytic converters and diesel particulate filters.  Sulfur content in gasoline was limited to an average of 120 parts-per-million (maximum 300 ppm) in 2004, and this was reduced to an average 30 ppm (maximum 80 ppm) for 2006.  Ultra-low sulfur diesel began to be restricted to a maximum 15 ppm in 2006 and refiners are to be 100% compliant with that level by 2010.

Tier III 
The phase-in of new tailpipe and evaporative emission standards begin to phase-in beginning with the 2017 model year along with new fuel standards.

Heavy-duty vehicles 

Heavy-duty vehicles must comply with more stringent exhaust emission standards and requires ultra-low sulfur diesel (ULSD) fuel (15 ppm maximum) beginning in 2007 model year.

Greenhouse gases

Federal emissions regulations cover the primary component of vehicle exhaust, carbon dioxide (CO2).  Since CO2 emissions are proportional to
the amount of fuel used, the national Corporate Average Fuel Economy regulations are the primary way in which automotive CO2 emissions are regulated in the U.S. The EPA faced a lawsuit seeking to compel it to regulate greenhouse gases as a pollutant, Massachusetts v. Environmental Protection Agency.

As of 2007, the California Air Resources Board passed strict greenhouse gas emission standards which are being challenged in the courts.

On September 12, 2007, a judge in Vermont ruled in favor of allowing states to conditionally regulate greenhouse gas (GHG) emissions from new cars and trucks, defeating an attempt by automakers to block state emissions standards. A group of automakers including General Motors, DaimlerChrysler, and the Alliance of Automobile Manufacturers had sued the state of Vermont to block rules calling for a 30 percent reduction in GHG emissions by 2016. Members of the auto industry argued that complying with these regulations would require major technological advances and raise the prices of vehicles as much as $6,000 per automobile. U.S. District Judge William K. Sessions III dismissed these claims in his ruling. "The court remains unconvinced automakers cannot meet the challenge of Vermont and California's (greenhouse gas) regulations," he wrote.

Environmentalists pressed the Administration to grant California a waiver from the EPA for its emissions standards to take effect. Doing so would allow Vermont and other states to adopt these same standards under the Clean Air Act. Without such a waiver, Judge Sessions wrote, the Vermont rules will be invalid.

2010–2016 
In 2009, President Obama announced a new national fuel economy and emissions policy that incorporated California's contested plan to curb greenhouse gas emissions on its own, apart from federal government regulations.

The average for its cars will have to be 42 mpg, and for its trucks will be 26 mpg by 2016, all based upon CAFE Standards. If the average fuel economy of a manufacturer's annual fleet of vehicle production falls below the defined standard, the manufacturer must pay a penalty, currently US$5.50 per 0.1 mpg under the standard, multiplied by the manufacturer's total production for the U.S. domestic market. This is in addition to any gas guzzler tax, if applicable.

Should CAFE targets have been extended through to 2026 under the Obama administration, it would have sought a 54 mpg industry-wide average fuel efficiency for cars and light trucks manufactured in 2026 or later, with automobile manufacturers instructed to increase the fuel economy across all of their vehicles by 5% each year.

A second round of California standards, known as Low Emission Vehicle II, is timed to coordinate with the Tier 2 rollout.

The PZEV and AT-PZEV ratings are for vehicles which achieve a SULEV II rating and also have systems to eliminate evaporative emissions from the fuel system and which have 150,000-mile/15-year warranties on emission-control components. Several ordinary gasoline vehicles from the 2001 and later model years qualify as PZEVs. If a PZEV has technology that can also be used in ZEVs like an electric motor or high-pressure gaseous fuel tanks for compressed natural gas (CNG) or liquified petroleum gas (LPG), it qualifies as an AT-PZEV.

Diesel particulate filters became a requirement in 2014; gasoline vehicles were exempt.

Trump-era rollback and Biden-era reversal (2017–2021) 
After Donald Trump was inaugurated as president in 2017, he instructed the NHTSA and EPA to rollback Obama's CAFE standards, increasing the 2026 target to a then-projected 202 g CO2/mi and requiring only an annual 1.5% fleet efficiency improvement. The new rule was issued in March 2020. The Trump administration argued the rollback was required due to the increasing costs of cars on consumers that higher efficiencies would only make more expensive. The move was criticized by several environmentalists as well as the state of California, as the ruling coincided with Trump's efforts to remove the waiver for California emissions exemptions.

Following Joe Biden becoming president in 2021, he signed Executive Order 14057, "Catalyzing Clean Energy Industries and Jobs Through Federal Sustainability", which in addition to committing the federal government to implement clean transport options such as EVs, also committed to improving the fuel efficiency standards and reversing the Trump administration's actions., the EPA issued a new rule in December 2021 and to become enforceable by February 2022 that effectively restored the Obama-era standards, through decreasing the fleet-wide emissions target to a projected 161 g CO2/mi by the 2026 model year.

Consumer ratings

Air pollution score 

EPA's air pollution score represents the amount of health-damaging and smog-forming airborne pollutants the vehicle emits. Scoring ranges from 0 (worst) to 10 (best). The pollutants considered are nitrogen oxides (NOx), particulate matter (PM), carbon monoxide (CO), formaldehyde (HCHO), and various hydrocarbon measures – non-methane organic gases (NMOG), and non-methane hydrocarbons (NMHC), and total hydrocarbons (THC). This score does not include emissions of greenhouse gases (but see Greenhouse gas score, below).

Greenhouse gas score 
EPA's greenhouse gas score reflects the amount of greenhouse gases a vehicle will produce over its lifetime, based on typical consumer usage. The scoring is from 0 to 10, where 10 represents the lowest amount of greenhouse gases.

The Greenhouse gas score is determined from the vehicle's estimated fuel economy and its fuel type. The lower the fuel economy, the more greenhouse gas is emitted as a by-product of combustion. The amount of carbon dioxide emitted per liter or gallon burned varies by fuel type, since each type of fuel contains a different amount of carbon per gallon or liter.

The ratings reflect carbon dioxide (CO2), nitrous oxide (N2O) and methane (CH4) emissions, weighted to reflect each gas's relative contribution to the greenhouse effect.

California emission standards
Under Section 209 of the Clean Air Act (CAA), California is given the ability to apply for special waivers to apply its own emission standards for new motor vehicles that are at least as stringent as the federal standards. California applies for this waiver through the EPA, which publishes the proposed standards for public review in the Federal Register. Based on its own review and public comments, the EPA then grants the waiver unless it has determined that California's requested standards were "arbitrary and capricious" in their findings, that the standards are not needed to "meet compelling and extraordinary conditions", or otherwise are inconsistent with other aspects of the CAA.

Since the CAA's passage in 1967, California has applied and received more than fifty waivers, which include emission standards across various vehicle classes. Among these include two special sets of waivers:
 California initiated its zero-emission vehicle (ZEV) mandate in 1990. ZEV are defined as vehicles that have no exhaust or evaporative emissions of any regulated pollutant. Vehicle manufacturers were a percentage of their fleet meeting these ZEV standards over a long-term schedule (2% by model year 1998 at its start), but the mandate schedule has shifted based on the unplanned rate of technology advancement and costs, and as of 2020, its current target is to reach 8% ZEV by 2025 determined by fleet credits that account for vehicle range as well as contributions from any low-emission vehicles or plug-in hybrids. The EPA granted the initial request in 1990 and several updates.
 California had requested to regulate greenhouse gas emissions (GHG) at stricter levels than federal levels first in 2005 as part of its low-emission vehicle program. The EPA initially refused this waiver based on a decision from the United States Court of Appeals for the District of Columbia Circuit that determined the EPA did not have the authority to regulate GHG under the CAA; this ruling was challenged in the Supreme Court case Massachusetts v. Environmental Protection Agency (549 U.S. 497 (2007)) which ruled that the EPA did have this authority. In later actions, the EPA granted California its GHG waiver by 2009.

State adoption of California Standards 
Section 177 of the CAA grants the ability for states to adopt California emission standards instead of federal ones. As of December 2021, the following states have adopted the California standards, including their standards for ZEV and GHG:

Revocation of waivers under the Trump administration
Former President Donald Trump stated his concern about California's stricter emission standards and their impact on the costs of manufacturing on the automobile industry, though some political analysts asserted this also tied in with Trump's conservative ideology conflicting with California's more liberal stance. Along with the Obama-era mileage goals, Trump had expressed his intent to revoke California's waivers early on in his presidency.

Shortly after Ford, Volkswagen, Honda, and BMW announced their intentions to commit to the Obama-era mileage goals and California's emission standards across their fleets in July 2019, Trump announced his intention to rollback California's waivers. As part of Trump's Safer, Affordable, Fuel-Efficient (SAFE) program, the EPA and NHTSA proposed a new "One National Program Rule" that asserted that only the federal government may set emissions standards on September 19, 2019, as to have one consistent set of fuel emission and mileage standards across the country. This rule would include revoking the last set of California waivers that the EPA had granted California in 2013 for its GHG and ZEV programs. California retained its ability to set emission standards that address ozone-formation under the rule.

Subsequent to this rule, California led a collation of 23 states to sue the NHTSA in California v. Chao (Case 1:19-cv-02826) in the D.C. District Court in September 2019, asserting the agency, in setting the rule, violated the intent of the CAA. The same group of states also filed suit against the EPA once the EPA issued the revoking of the 2013 waiver in November 2019, in California v. Wheeler (Case 19-1239) in the United States Court of Appeals for the District of Columbia Circuit to challenge the EPA's revoking. Further, both Minnesota and New Mexico, plaintiffs in both cases, stated they would take steps to adapt California's standards in their states as a result.

Following the election of Joe Biden as president, the EPA and NHTSA moved to reverse the 2019 rule in April 2021, thus returning to the previous status quo for California. Following the EPA granting California its latest request for exemption, seventeen states sued the EPA in May 2022, arguing that because of the impact of California emission standards on vehicle manufacturing, the EPA's actions violate the equal sovereignty granted to the states by the Constitution, since it gives California more power than other states in setting emissions regulations.

Non-road engines

Non-road engines, including equipment and vehicles that are not operated on the public roadways, are used in an extremely wide range of applications, each involving great differences in operating characteristics and engine technology. Emissions from all non-road engines are regulated by categories.

In the United States, the emission standards for non-road diesel engines are published in the US Code of Federal Regulations, Title 40, Part 89 (40 CFR Part 89). Tier 1–3 Standards were adopted in 1994 and was phased in between 1996 and 2000 for engines over 37 kW (50 hp). In 1998 the regulation included engines under 37 kW and introduced more stringent Tier 2 and Tier 3 standards which was scheduled to be phased in between 2000 and 2008. In 2004, US EPA introduced the more stringent Tier 4 standards which was scheduled to be phased in between 2008 and 2015. The testing cycles used for certification follow the ISO 8178 standards.

Small engines
Pollution from small engines, such as those used in gas-powered groundskeeping equipment reduces air quality.  Emissions from small offroad engines are regulated by the EPA. Specific pollutants subject to limits include hydrocarbons, carbon monoxide, and nitrogen oxides.

Existing vehicle emissions standard

Testing of existing vehicle emissions, also known as vehicle inspection and maintenance programs (I/M) were introduced as part of the 1977 Amendments to the CAA. The 1970 Amendments introduced target NAAQS goals for air quality which were not met in many parts of the country. With the 1977 Amendments, the CAA required I/M programs in non-attainment states as part of their pollution prevent plans.

For model years prior to 1996, emissions tests were performed using a chassis dynamometer-based test; The vehicle is driven so that the wheels of its main driven axle (front or rear) sit atop the dynamometer rotors, when then are unlocked to rotate freely. A special collections line is attached to the tailpipe, and simulated airflow is pushed across the engine to simulate vehicle movement. The test operator then presses the accelerator of the car through a fixed test schedule: the acceleration from the engine translates to force and torque that are measured through the dynamometer, simultaneously mapped against analysis of the emissions from the tailpipe. After completion of the schedule, the computerized system calculates the emissions from the car and determines if it meets the appropriate specification for its model year.

Since model year 1994, all LDV and LDT manufactured for use in the United States are required to use the standard on-board diagnostic OBD-II system. This is a computerized system that continually monitors the performance of the engine and its emission control system. Instead of the dynamometer test, the operator hooks the OBD-II to a standard computer system which downloads the information from the computer. It will warn the operator if the OBD-II determines significant deviations from expected emissions control standards, indicating repairs may be needed.

See also 

 Regulation of greenhouse gases under the Clean Air Act
 Regulation on non-exhaust emissions
 AP 42 Compilation of Air Pollutant Emission Factors
 Emissions standard
 List of low emissions locomotives
 Motor vehicle emissions
 Portable Emissions Measurement System
 Timeline of major U.S. environmental and occupational health regulation
 Vehicle emissions control

References

External links
 EPA fuel economy guide for consumers
 EPA Green Vehicles guide
 EPA Climate Change guide
 Dieselnet: Cars and Light-Duty Trucks—Tier 1
 Dieselnet: Cars and Light-Duty Trucks—Tier 2
 Dieselnet: Cars and Light-Duty Trucks—California
 Emissions: Vehicle Emission Ratings Decoded

Air pollution in the United States
Emission standards
Environmental law in the United States